Choto Haibor is a census town in Nagaon district  in the state of Assam, India.

Demographics
At the 2001 India census, Choto Haibor had a population of 5,247. Males constitute 52% of the population, and females constitute 48%. Choto Haibor has an average literacy rate of 67%, higher than the national average of 59.5%, with male literacy of 72% and female literacy of 62%. 13% of the population is under 6 years of age.

References

Cities and towns in Nagaon district